David Yosef (born August 10, 1957) is an Israeli rabbi who has authored dozens of books in Jewish Law mainly based on the rulings of his father, Rabbi Ovadia Yosef. He is regarded as one of the most influential Sephardic Rabbis in the world due to having scores of students serving as Rabbinic figures across the globe. 

David Yosef is the chief rabbi of the Har Nof neighborhood in Jerusalem, the head of the Yechaveh Da'at Kollel, and a member of the Moetzet Chachmei HaTorah of the Shas party.

Yosef is also a lecturer at Chazaq, a New York City-based outreach organization for Jewish public school students. He is a frequent guest by the Syrian American community in Brooklyn and the Sephardic community in France and Mexico. 

In October 2020, Yosef was forced to resign as a state-paid rabbi due to violating regulations for public servants, which prohibit public servants from expressing political opinions in public, and also prohibit offensive or discriminatory speech against groups. Violations include a 2019 statement exhorting the public to vote for Shas: “Everyone must fulfil their holy obligation to vote for Shas and only Shas! A Sephardi Jew who doesn’t vote for Shas is basically, God forbid, harming the honor of [my] father [Rabbi Ovadia Yosef].” He has also spoken vitriolically about the Reform movement and the Women of the Wall prayer rights organization including statements such as: “One must stand up in every place and talk about the lie of the Reform”, “the evil son in the [Passover] Haggadah is Reform”, and referred to Reform rabbis as “snakes”. He has spoken disparagingly about the Women of the Wall, saying: “these idiots put on tefillin,” that their activity was “promiscuous, coarse, vulgar, immodest and shameless,” and that “they have no connection to authentic Judaism.”

References

1957 births
Shas
People from Jerusalem
Egyptian Jews
Ovadia Yosef
Sephardic Haredi rabbis in Israel
Moetzet Chachmei HaTorah
Living people